The sixth season of The Good Wife began airing on September 21, 2014 on CBS, and concluded on May 10, 2015. It consisted of 22 episodes.

Premise

The series focuses on Alicia Florrick (Margulies), whose husband Peter (Noth), the former Cook County, Illinois State's Attorney, has been jailed following a notorious political corruption and sex scandal. After having spent the previous thirteen years as a stay-at-home mother, Alicia returns to the workforce as a litigator to provide for her two children.

Cast

Main
 Julianna Margulies as Alicia Florrick
 Matt Czuchry as Cary Agos
 Archie Panjabi as Kalinda Sharma
 Graham Phillips as Zach Florrick
 Makenzie Vega as Grace Florrick
 Alan Cumming as Eli Gold
 Matthew Goode as Finn Polmar
 Zach Grenier as David Lee
 Christine Baranski as Diane Lockhart

Recurring
 Chris Noth as Peter Florrick
 Sarah Steele as Marissa Gold
 Steven Pasquale as Johnny Elfman
 Mike Colter as Lemond Bishop
 David Hyde Pierce as Frank Prady
 Michael Cerveris as James Castro
 Michael J. Fox as Louis Canning
 David Krumholtz as Josh Mariner
 Renée Elise Goldsberry as Geneva Pine
 Ben Rappaport as Carey Zepps
 Jerry Adler as Howard Lyman
 Connie Nielsen as Ramona Lytton
 Jill Flint as Lana Delaney
 Linda Lavin as Joy Grubick
 Taye Diggs as Dean Levine-Wilkins
 Oliver Platt as Reese Dipple
 Mary Beth Peil as Jackie Florrick
 Jess Weixler as Robyn Burdine
 Dallas Roberts as Owen Cavanaugh
 Carrie Preston as Elsbeth Tascioni
 Kyle MacLachlan as Josh Perotti
 Chris Butler as Matan Brody
 Gary Cole as Kurt McVeigh
 Edward Asner as Guy Redmayne
 J. D. Williams as Dexter Roja
 Tim Guinee as Andrew Wiley
 David Paymer as Judge Richard Cuesta

Guest
 Michael Boatman as Julius Cain
 Christian Borle as Carter Schmidt
 Denis O'Hare as Judge Charles Abernathy
 Jill Flint as Lana Delaney
 Dylan Baker as Colin Sweeney
 Ana Gasteyer as Judge Patrice Lessner
 Kurt Fuller as Judge Peter Dunaway
 Rita Wilson as Viola Walsh
 John Benjamin Hickey as Neil Gross
 Miriam Shor as Mandy Post
 Stockard Channing as Veronica Loy
 Laura Benanti as Renata Ellard
 Ron Rifkin as Spencer Randolph
 Kelli Giddish as Sophia Russo

Episodes

U.S. ratings

Reception
The sixth season of The Good Wife received critical acclaim. The review aggregator website Rotten Tomatoes reports a 100% certified fresh rating based on 30 reviews. The website's consensus reads, "Though in its sixth season, The Good Wife remains one of network television's best shows with sharp writing, vibrant characters, and high production values." On Metacritic, the sixth season currently sits at an 89 out of 100, based on 9 critics, indicating "universal acclaim".

References

External links
 
 

2014 American television seasons
2015 American television seasons
6